No. 149 Squadron RAF was a Royal Air Force Squadron between 1918 and 1956. Formed 1918 in the Royal Flying Corps as a night-bomber unit, it remained in that role for the rest of its existence which spanned three periods between 1918 and 1956.

History

World War I
Formed on 3 March 1918 at RAF Ford, near Yapton, West Sussex, as No. 149 (NB) Squadron RFC, the squadron soon moved to France for night bombing missions above occupied France and Belgium, flying Royal Aircraft Factory F.E.2s. After the war the squadron for three months took part in the occupation force in Germany, being stationed at Bickendorf, moving to Ireland in March 1919 where the squadron was disbanded on 1 August 1919.

World War II

Vickers Wellington

The squadron was reformed from 'B' Flight of No. 99 Squadron RAF on 12 April 1937 under No. 3 Group RAF at RAF Mildenhall, Suffolk where it remained until April 1942. Initially equipped with Heyford biplane bombers, the squadron converted to Vickers Wellingtons in January 1939. On 4 September 1939 L4259 was flown on "Ops Brunsbüttel 4/500 GP", the day after the declaration of war against Germany by Great Britain. (Source Pilot's Logbook).

Target for Tonight
During the last two weeks of March and the first two weeks of April 1941, Wellingtons and their crews of No. 149 Sqn were used for the making of the film Target for Tonight. Filmed on location at RAF Mildenhall, the Station took the fictitious name of Millerton Aerodrome in order so not to give away valuable operational information to the enemy, and several other aspects were altered involving the day-to-day operations.  The film, produced by the Crown Film Unit, focused on the planning and execution of an air raid on Germany, as seen by the crew of Vickers Wellington OJ-F 'F for Freddie'. The exception to this was Percy Pickard who was at that time Squadron Leader with No. 311 (Czechoslovak) Squadron. Pickard played the part of Sqn Ldr Dickson, the captain of 'F for Freddie'.

Short Stirling
After being re-equipped with the Short Stirling in November 1941, the squadron took part in the first 1,000 bomber raid. The squadron also formed No. 149 Squadron Conversion flight on 21 January 1942 to train new Stirling crews and on 7 October this was formed into 1657 Heavy Conversion Unit (HCU) together with 7, 101 and 218 Squadron Conversion Flights. In August 1944, the Stirlings gave way to Avro Lancasters, which served the squadron until 1949. At the end of the war no. 149 squadron participated in Operation Manna, to drop food to the starved Dutch population still under German occupation, and Operation Exodus, to return former prisoners of war back to the UK.

Post war
After the war no. 149 squadron continued to fly with RAF Bomber Command, moving to RAF Tuddenham in April 1946 and then later in November on to RAF Stradishall. In February 1949 the squadron returned to RAF Mildenhall, where the Lancasters were replaced with Avro Lincolns. The squadron remained at Mildenhall until disbanding on 1 March 1950.

Retirement was short though, because on 14 August 1950 the squadron was reformed as the RAF's first Boeing Washington bomber unit, moving to RAF Coningsby in October of that year. The Washingtons were on loan by the RAF from the USAF as an interim nuclear bomber pending the arrival of the RAF's own jet bomber, the Canberra. The squadron reequipped with the Canberra in March 1953 and in August 1954 it relocated to RAF Ahlhorn in West-Germany, where it joined 125 wing of Royal Air Force Germany. The following month it moved again, this time to RAF Gutersloh, where it the unit had its final disbandment two years later on 31 August 1956.

Aircraft operated

See also
 List of Royal Air Force aircraft squadrons

References

Notes

Bibliography

 Bowyer, Michael J.F. and John D.R. Rawlings. Squadron Codes, 1937–56. Bar Hill, Cambridge, UK: Patrick Stephens Ltd., 1979. .
 Falconer, Jonathan. Stirling Wings: The Short Stirling Goes to War. Trupp, Stroud, Gloucestershire: Budding Books, 1997. .
 Flintham, Vic and Andrew Thomas. Combat Codes: A Full Explanation and Listing of British, Commonwealth and Allied Air Force Unit Codes since 1938. Shrewsbury, Shropshire, UK: Airlife Publishing Ltd., 2003. .
 Fopp, Michael A. The Washington File. Tonbridge, Kent, UK: Air-Britain (Historians) Ltd., 1983. .
 Halley, James J. The Squadrons of the Royal Air Force & Commonwealth, 1918–1988. Tonbridge, Kent, UK: Air-Britain (Historians) Ltd., 1988. .
 Jefford, C.G. RAF Squadrons, a Comprehensive Record of the Movement and Equipment of all RAF Squadrons and their Antecedents since 1912. Shrewsbury: Airlife Publishing, 2001. .
 Johnston, John and Nick Carter. Strong by Night: History and Memories of No. 149 (East India) Squadron Royal Air Force, 1918/19 – 1937/56. Tunbridge Wells, Kent, UK: Air-Britain (Historians) Ltd., 2002. .
 Moyes, Philip J.R. Bomber Squadrons of the RAF and their Aircraft. London: Macdonald and Jane's (Publishers) Ltd., 1964 (new edition 1976). .

External links

 History 149 squadron
 Another history of 149 squadron
 Flight Sergeant R.H. Middleton, VC
 Official history 149 squadron
 Airfields, operating dates and aircraft types for 149 Squadron
 Air of Authority – A History of RAF Organisation
 149 Squadron Aircraft & Markings

149 Squadron
149 Squadron
Military units and formations established in 1918
1918 establishments in the United Kingdom